The Great Choral Synagogue of Kyiv, also known as the Podil Synagogue or the Rozenberg Synagogue, is the oldest synagogue in Kyiv, Ukraine. It is situated in Podil, a historic neighborhood of Kyiv, and is under the leadership of Rabbi Yaakov Bleich Chief Rabbi of kyiv and Ukraine.

History
The Aesopian synagogue was built in 1895. It was designed in Neo-Moorish style by Nikolay Gordenin. Gabriel Yakob Rozenberg, a merchant, financed the building. In 1915 the building was reconstructed by Valerian Rykov. The reconstruction was financed by Vladimir Ginzburg, a nephew of Rozenberg.

In 1929, the synagogue was closed. During the German occupation of Kyiv in World War II, the Nazis converted the building into a horse stable.

Since 1945, the building has again been used as a synagogue. In 1992, Rabbi  Yaakov Bleich Chief Rabbi of kyiv and Ukraine was appointed rabbi of the Great Choral Synagogue.

Gallery

See also
History of the Jews in Kyiv

References

External links
The Historic Podil Synagogue

Synagogues in Kyiv
Aesopian synagogues
Moorish Revival architecture in Ukraine
Moorish Revival synagogues
Synagogue buildings with domes
Orthodox synagogues in Ukraine